Daniel Kreutzfeldt (born 19 November 1987, in Roskilde) is a Danish track cyclist. His brother, Christian, is also a racing cyclist.

Palmarès 

2005
National Track Championships
3rd, Pursuit
2nd, Team Pursuit

2006
National Track Championships
 1st, Team Pursuit (with Alex Rasmussen, Casper Jørgensen and Martin Lollesgaard)
2006–2007 UIV Cup
 3rd, Amsterdam

2007
2006–2007 UIV Cup
1st, Bremen (with Robert Kriegs)
2nd, Copenhagen
3rd, Rotterdam

National Track Championships
 1, Team Pursuit (with Alex Rasmussen, Casper Jørgensen and Martin Lollesgaard)
 3, Scratch
 3, 1 km time trial

2007–2008 UIV Cup
 3rd, Amsterdam

2008
 3rd, Jysk/Fynsk Mesterskab

Ringerike GP
 1st, Stage 5
 1st, Young rider classification

National Track Championships
 3rd, Team Pursuit
 2nd, 1 km time trial

 3rd, Chrono des Herbiers

2008–2009 Track Cycling World Cup
 2nd, Team Pursuit, Manchester

 2nd, Six Days of Copenhagen

2009
2008–2009 Track Cycling World Cup
 3rd, Team Pursuit, Copenhagen

Track Cycling World Championships, Pruszków, Poland
 2nd, Points race

 3rd, Stage 3, Circuit des Ardennes

External links 

Danish male cyclists
Olympic cyclists of Denmark
Cyclists at the 2008 Summer Olympics
People from Roskilde
Danish track cyclists
1987 births
Living people
Sportspeople from Region Zealand